The Notre Dame–Stanford football rivalry is an American college football rivalry between the Notre Dame Fighting Irish football team of the University of Notre Dame and Stanford Cardinal football team of Stanford University. As of 2022, the Notre Dame Fighting Irish and Stanford Cardinal have met 36 times, beginning in 1925 (though the modern series began in 1988).  The Notre Dame–Stanford game has been played annually since 1997, with the teams meeting at Notre Dame Stadium earlier in the season (late September to mid-October) in even-numbered years, and at Stanford Stadium on the weekend following Thanksgiving in odd-numbered years since 1999.  The game typically alternates positions in Notre Dame's schedule with its other Pac-12 opponent, USC.

Trophy

The winner of the game gains the Legends Trophy, a Dublin Irish crystal bowl resting on a California redwood base. The trophy was presented for the first time in 1989 by the Notre Dame Club of the San Francisco Bay Area.

Series history
The series began on January 1, 1925 (the end of the 1924 season) when Notre Dame's Four Horsemen and head coach Knute Rockne faced Stanford's Ernie Nevers and head coach Pop Warner at the 1925 Rose Bowl. Notre Dame's 27–10 victory earned their first-ever national title and the first of four national titles to come via bowl victories.

After the two teams' first meeting at the 1925 Rose Bowl, they did not play each other again until 1942. They did not meet again until playing two games in 1963 and 1964. Those four games were the only games before the modern series began. Notre Dame and Stanford have played the modern series annually since 1988 (except in 1995 and 1996).  The series is renewed through at least the 2024 season, however the 2020 game was canceled as part of the Pac-12 Conference's decision to cancel all non-conference games because of the COVID-19 pandemic.

Game results

As of 2022, Notre Dame leads the series 21–14, though the Cardinal lead 8–4 in the last thirteen games (8–5 if Notre Dame's vacated 2012 victory is included). The Fighting Irish hold the longest win-streak in the series, with seven wins from 2002 to 2008. The Cardinal's longest win streak were a pair of 3-win streaks from 2009 to 2011 and from 2015 to 2017. The back-to-back wins in 2009 and 2010 were the school's first consecutive victories in the series. Notre Dame is 11–5 at home (12–5 if Notre Dame's vacated 2012 victory is included) while Stanford is 9–8 at home. Notre Dame won the only game played at a neutral site at the 1925 Rose Bowl.

Game notes

See also

 List of NCAA college football rivalry games

Notes

References

College football rivalries in the United States
Stanford
Stanford Cardinal football